The Lamanda Park Line, also known as the Colorado Street Line, was a local line of the Pacific Electric Railway serving Pasadena until 1941.

History
The original  horsecar line was established by the Colorado Street Railway on November 9, 1886. Along with other Pasadena horsecar lines, it was purchased by the Pasadena and Los Angeles Electric Railway in 1894. Pasadena Electric succeeded the Pasadena and Los Angeles in 1902 and by 1903 the line had been electrified and converted to standard gauge. The line was extended from Hill Avenue to Lamanda Park on March 1, 1904.

The Pasadena Electric was absorbed into the Pacific Electric in 1911 under terms of the Great Merger. In March 1936, the tracks east of Lamanda Park Junction were abandoned. The final local car ran over the line early in the morning of January 19, 1941, but a portion of the route would continue to see Pasadena via Oak Knoll Line trains until 1950. The service was sold to Pasadena City Lines, a subsidiary of National City Lines, which ran buses over the route.

Route
The line operated on Colorado Boulevard between Daisy Avenue and the Pasadena Pacific Electric station on Fair Oaks Drive. Services throughout the line's life were through routed to other Pasadena local lines or terminated in Downtown Pasadena. Running along the route of the Tournament of Roses Parade caused annual operational issues on New Year's Day, usually resulting in rail replacement bus services.

List of major stops

References

Pacific Electric routes
History of Pasadena, California
Light rail in California
Railway lines opened in 1886
1886 establishments in California
Railway lines closed in 1941
1941 disestablishments in California
Closed railway lines in the United States